Carroll F. Ketchum (October 4, 1937 – February 26, 2022) was an American politician and businessman.

Ketchum was born in Randolph, Vermont. He graduated from Whitcomb High School in Bethel, Vermont. Ketchum lived in Bethel with his wife and family. He worked in the banking business. Ketchum served in the Vermont House of Representatives from 2001 to 2004.

References

1937 births
2022 deaths
People from Bethel, Vermont
People from Randolph, Vermont
Businesspeople from Vermont
Members of the Vermont House of Representatives